Schwarza is a river of Thuringia, Germany. It joins the Ilm in Tannroda.

See also
List of rivers of Thuringia

Rivers of Thuringia
Rivers of Germany